The Surveyor General of Western Australia is the person nominally responsible for government surveying in Western Australia.  

In the early history of Western Australia, the office of surveyor general was one of the most important public offices. The first surveyor general, John Septimus Roe, was responsible for the laying out of many townsites, including Perth and Fremantle, and played a prominent role in the politics of the day.  Another surveyor general, John Forrest, became Premier of Western Australia, and later a Cabinet minister in Australia's first federal government.

In modern times, the position of surveyor general has diminished in importance. It remains a statutory office, and is housed within the current agency named Landgate.

List of surveyors general of Western Australia
This is a list of surveyors general of Western Australia.

See also
 Department of Lands and Surveys, Western Australia
 Surveyor Generals Corner
 Surveyor General of New South Wales
 Surveyor General of Queensland
 Surveyor General of South Australia
 Surveyor General of Tasmania
 Surveyor General of the Northern Territory
 Surveyor General of Victoria

References

Lists of British, Australian and New Zealand Surveyors-General, Government Geologists... Retrieved 5 September 2016
Australian Dictionary of Biography Surveyor-General search Retrieved 27 June 2012